Gubanovka, rural localities in Russia, may refer to:

 Gubanovka, Kaluga Oblast, a village
 Gubanovka, Kursk Oblast, a village

 See also
 Gubanov